David Cargill (born 15 April 1957) is a British former alpine skier who competed in the 1980 Winter Olympics.

References

External links
 

1957 births
Living people
British male alpine skiers
Olympic alpine skiers of Great Britain
Alpine skiers at the 1980 Winter Olympics
Place of birth missing (living people)